Ruthless Records was an American record label founded by Eric "Eazy-E" Wright and Jerry Heller in Compton, California in 1986, where all of the Ruthless trademarks have been owned by Comptown Records, Inc. since 1987. Several artists on the label such as N.W.A, Eazy-E, MC Ren, The D.O.C., Michel'le, and Bone Thugs-n-Harmony have released RIAA certified albums.

History

N.W.A days
The label's first successful single was Eazy's "Boyz-n-the-Hood". It also released singles by underground California acts Frost and J.J. Fad. The label's first album was N.W.A's Straight Outta Compton, which was eventually certified Triple Platinum by the RIAA.  Immediately following this was the release of Eazy's solo debut, Eazy-Duz-It.

As the six members went on tour in support of their project, some began to voice their displeasure with the financial situation at Ruthless. According to group member MC Ren, it was a common opinion that N.W.A manager and Ruthless co-founder Jerry Heller was the one receiving their due:

Jerry Heller, in his 2006 memoir Ruthless, disputes any allegations of financial misconduct.

The label also experienced outside pressure due to the group. The success of their song "Fuck tha Police" led to a threatening F.B.I. letter to distributor Priority Records. After coming off tour, group member Ice Cube voiced his opinions on the group's finances. Though Heller continually claims that everything was in order, and has even offered them to open the account books to prove his innocence, the ensuing confrontation ended in Ice Cube leaving Ruthless without signing on as a solo artist, which the remaining members proceeded to do.

1988 also saw the release of J.J. Fad's gold-certified album Supersonic, produced by founding N.W.A member Arabian Prince and in 1989, singer Michel'le's eponymous self-titled album, and The D.O.C.'s critically acclaimed No One Can Do It Better (all released through Atlantic), all produced by N.W.A beat-smiths Dr. Dre and DJ Yella; following these efforts, Dre returned to N.W.A, producing the 100 Miles and Runnin' E.P. and the group's sophomore effort, Niggaz4Life, which reached Platinum status. Above the Law's Livin' Like Hustlers was also released during this period (by way of Epic Records).

In 1989, Eazy signed hip-hop's first white female rapper Tairrie B to Ruthless' new Comptown label subsidiary. She released her debut album The Power of a Woman in 1990 (through MCA Records) featuring the single and video for "Murder She Wrote" which Eazy and Philadelphia rapper Schoolly D appeared in. The album also featured guest vocals by Dr. Dre, D.O.C. and future House of Pain frontman Everlast, and production by QDIII.

N.W.A breakup and other Ruthless artists
Though N.W.A was highly successful, Dr. Dre was advised by The D.O.C. and the rapper's friend, Suge Knight, that he should leave the label to avoid any possible financial meddling by Heller, offering to extricate Dr. Dre from his Ruthless contract. Eventually, Suge succeeded in procuring Dre, D.O.C. and Michel'le's contracts—through reportedly illicit means—and proceeded to set up Death Row with Dr. Dre.

Now short of Dr. Dre, Eazy-E signed various other acts that would assist him in a subsequent rivalry with Death Row. Gangsta Dresta and B.G. Knocc Out were among the most vocal of these rappers, with DJ Yella, 187 um and new producer Rhythum D producing. While MC Ren and DJ Yella stayed neutral, they remained with Ruthless, releasing several LPs. Eazy-E released several high-profile LPs dissing Dr. Dre, including most famously It's On (Dr. Dre) 187um Killa. Producer Big Hutch/Cold 187 um alleges that during this time period, with Ruthless switching distributors from Priority to Relativity and Epic, even Wright began to feel as though Heller wasn't being honest with the label's finances:

However he added, "... I can’t knock Jerry Heller... because Jerry Heller gave us all an opportunity. He took us to the people to get massive exposure. We couldn’t have walked through the doors as brothers like that. We needed a guy like Jerry Heller to do that. You need that face, you need that voice, you need that guy with a connect like that. Without him there wouldn’t have been none of that..."

Eazy-E allegedly fired Jerry Heller, shortly before his death in 1995.

Eazy-E's death
On March 1, 1995, Eazy-E was diagnosed with HIV/AIDS; around this time he was beginning to work on his third LP. He had just signed the Cleveland, Ohio-based group Bone Thugs-n-Harmony, whose 1994 extended play Creepin on ah Come Up was well received by critics and fans. Eazy-E executive produced Bone Thugs' second album, E 1999 Eternal, which was released shortly after his death on March 26, 1995, of HIV/AIDS in Cedars-Sinai Medical Center in Los Angeles, California. Their smash 1996 single "Tha Crossroads" was dedicated to Eazy-E and helped push the album to multi-platinum success.

The label has had several distributors simultaneously. Early Ruthless releases were distributed by Macola (including certain material from JJ Fad which was made prior to the completion of the Supersonic album, which were at first released on Ruthless' short-lived Dream Team subsidiary), but that deal was short-lived and the rights reverted to Ruthless. All of N.W.A's releases and Eazy-E's  debut solo album on Ruthless Records were distributed by Priority, and the rights to these releases are now held by Priority's new owner, Capitol. Releases by The D.O.C, Michel'le, Yomo & Maulkie and JJ Fad were marketed through Atlantic or its subsidiary Atco. These master rights are still held by Atlantic's parent company, Warner, while Above The Law's releases were marketed through Epic and Giant.  In 1994, Ruthless found exclusive distribution through Relativity, a former heavy metal label. Relativity was later folded into its parent company, Sony.

Former artists

Notes

Discography

References

Works cited
Billboard

External links
 Biography of Eazy-E

Hip hop record labels
American record labels
Record labels established in 1987
Record labels disestablished in 2009
Epic Records
Compton, California
Gangsta rap record labels
Eazy-E
Atlantic Records